The following elections occurred in the year 2006.

 Elections in 2006
 Electoral calendar 2006
 2006 Acehnese regional election
 2006 American Samoan legislative election
 2006 Bahraini parliamentary election
 2006 Costa Rican presidential election
 2006 Fijian presidential election
 2006 Fijian general election
 2006 Georgian local elections
 2006 Iranian Assembly of Experts election
 2006 Iranian City and Village Councils elections
 2006 Kuwaiti parliamentary election
 2006 Matavera by-election
 2006 Netherlands Antilles general election
 2006 Palestinian legislative election
 2006 Republic of China municipal elections
 2006 Samoan general election
 2006 Singaporean general election
 2006 Solomon Islands general election
 2006 Tajikistani presidential election
 2006 Thai general election
 October 2006 Thai general election
 2006 Thai local elections
 2006 Transnistrian presidential election
 2006 Tuvaluan general election
 2006 United Arab Emirates parliamentary election
 2006 United Nations Security Council election
 2006 Yemeni presidential election

Africa
 2006 Beninese presidential election
 2006 Cape Verdean parliamentary election
 2006 Cape Verdean presidential election
 2006 Chadian presidential election
 2006 Comorian presidential election
 2006 Democratic Republic of the Congo general election
 2006 Gabonese legislative election
 2006 Gambian presidential election
 2006 Malagasy presidential election
 2006 Mauritanian parliamentary election
 2006 São Tomé and Príncipe legislative election
 2006 São Tomé and Príncipe presidential election
 2006 Seychellois presidential election
 2006 South African municipal election
 2006 Ugandan general election
 2006 Zambian general election

Asia
 2006 Bahraini parliamentary election
 2006 Democratic Progressive Party chairmanship election
 2006 Iranian Assembly of Experts election
 2006 Iranian City and Village Councils elections
 2006 Israeli legislative election
 2006 Kuwaiti parliamentary election
 2006 Laotian parliamentary election
 2006 Nagorno-Karabakh constitutional referendum
 2006 Palestinian legislative election
 2006 Republic of China municipal elections
 2006 Singaporean general election
 2006 Tajikistani presidential election
 2006 Thai general election
 October 2006 Thai general election
 2006 Thai local elections
 2006 United Arab Emirates parliamentary election
 2006 Yemeni presidential election

India

Japan
 2006 Fukagawa mayoral election
 2006 Fukuoka mayoral election
 2006 Fukushima gubernatorial election
 2006 Higashiosaka by-election
 2006 Higashiōsaka mayoral election
 2006 Ishikawa gubernatorial election
 2006 Kumamoto mayoral election
 2006 Liberal Democratic Party (Japan) leadership election
 2006 Naha local election
 2006 Niigata mayoral election
 2006 Okinawan gubernatorial election
 2006 Sanjo mayoral election
 2006 Shiga gubernatorial election
 2006 Shinagawa mayoral election
 2006 Shinjuku mayoral election
 2006 Wakayama gubernatorial election
 2006 Zushi mayoral election

Malaysia
 2006 Sarawak state election

Philippines
 2006 Dinagat Islands creation plebiscite
 2006 Shariff Kabunsuan creation plebiscite

Russia
 Elections in Astrakhan Oblast

Europe
 2006 Alderney election
 2006 Belarusian presidential election
 2006 Belgian provincial and municipal elections
 2006 Bosnia and Herzegovina general election
 2006 Bulgarian presidential election
 2006 Cypriot legislative election
 2006 Czech Senate election
 2006 Czech legislative election
 2006 Finnish presidential election
 2006 Georgian local elections
 Gibraltar Constitution Order 2006
 2006 Greek local elections
 2006 Hungarian parliamentary election
 2006 Ivano-Frankivsk Oblast local election
 2006 Latvian parliamentary election
 2006 Macedonian parliamentary election
 2006 Maltese local elections
 2006 Manx general election
 2006 Montenegrin parliamentary election
 2006 Nagorno-Karabakh constitutional referendum
 2006 Polish local elections
 2006 Portuguese presidential election
 2006 Progressive Democrats leadership election
 2006 Sammarinese general election
 2006 Serbian constitutional referendum
 2006 Slovak parliamentary election
 2006 Stockholm municipal election
 2006 Swedish general election
 2006 Ukrainian parliamentary election

Austria
 2006 Austrian legislative election

Germany
 2006 Baden-Württemberg state election
 2006 Berlin state election
 2006 Mecklenburg-Vorpommern state election
 2006 Rhineland-Palatinate state election
 2006 Saxony-Anhalt state election

Italy
 2006 Italian general election
 2006 Italian general election in Aosta Valley
 2006 Italian Senate election in Lombardy
 2006 Italian general election in Sardinia
 2006 Italian general election in Trentino-Alto Adige/Südtirol
 2006 Italian general election in Veneto
 2006 Italian local elections
 2006 Italian presidential election
 2006 Molise regional election
 2006 Sicilian regional election

Moldova
 2006 Transnistrian independence referendum
 2006 Transnistrian presidential election

Netherlands
 2006 Democrats 66 leadership election
 2006 Dutch general election
 2006 Dutch municipal elections
 2006 VVD leadership election

Russia
 Elections in Astrakhan Oblast

Spain
 2006 Catalan parliamentary election
 2006 Catalan constitutional referendum

Switzerland
 2006 Swiss Federal Council election

United Kingdom
 2006 Blaenau Gwent by-elections
 2006 Bromley and Chislehurst by-election
 2006 Dunfermline and West Fife by-election
 2006 Liberal Democrats deputy leadership election
 2006 Liberal Democrats leadership election
 2006 United Kingdom local elections
 2006 Moray by-election
 2006 UK Independence Party leadership election

United Kingdom local
 2006 United Kingdom local elections

English local
 2006 Adur Council election
 2006 Amber Valley Council election
 2006 Barnet Council election
 2006 Barrow-in-Furness Council election
 2006 Bassetlaw Council election
 2006 Blackburn with Darwen Council election
 2006 Bolton Council election
 2006 Brent Council election
 2006 Brentwood Council election
 2006 Bromley Council election
 2006 Broxbourne Council election
 2006 Burnley Council election
 2006 Calderdale Council election
 2006 Cambridge Council election
 2006 Camden Council election
 2006 Cheltenham Council election
 2006 Cherwell Council election
 2006 Chorley Council election
 2006 Colchester Council election
 2006 Coventry Council election
 2006 Craven Council election
 2006 Croydon Council election
 2006 Daventry Council election
 2006 Derby Council election
 2006 Eastleigh Council election
 2006 Ellesmere Port and Neston Council election
 2006 Epping Forest Council election
 2006 Fareham Council election
 2006 Gateshead Council election
 2006 Gosport Council election
 2006 Greenwich Council election
 2006 Hackney Council election
 2006 Halton Council election
 2006 Hammersmith and Fulham council election
 2006 Haringey Council election
 2006 Harlow Council election
 2006 Hart Council election
 2006 Hastings Council election
 2006 Hull Council election
 2006 Hyndburn Council election
 2006 Ipswich Borough Council election
 2006 Islington Council election
 2006 Kingston upon Thames Council election
 2006 Knowsley Council election
 2006 Lambeth Council election
 2006 Lewisham Council election
 2006 Liverpool Council election
 2006 London local elections
 2006 Macclesfield Council election
 2006 Manchester Council election
 2006 Mole Valley Council election
 2006 Newcastle-under-Lyme Council election
 2006 Newham Council election
 2006 North Tyneside Council election
 2006 Nuneaton and Bedworth Council election
 2006 Oxford City Council election
 2006 Penwith Council election
 2006 Portsmouth Council election
 2006 Preston Council election
 2006 Purbeck Council election
 2006 Redbridge Council election
 2006 Redditch Council election
 2006 Richmond upon Thames Council election
 2006 Rochdale Council election
 2006 Rochford Council election
 2006 Rossendale Council election
 2006 Runnymede Council election
 2006 Rushmoor Council election
 2006 Salford Council election
 2006 Sefton Council election
 2006 Sheffield Council election
 2006 Slough Council election
 2006 South Lakeland Council election
 2006 South Tyneside Council election
 2006 Southend-on-Sea Council election
 2006 Southwark Council election
 2006 St Albans Council election
 2006 St Helens Council election
 2006 Stevenage Council election
 2006 Stratford-on-Avon Council election
 2006 Swindon Council election
 2006 Tamworth Council election
 2006 Tandridge Council election
 2006 Three Rivers Council election
 2006 Thurrock Council election
 2006 Tower Hamlets Council election
 2006 Trafford Council election
 2006 Tunbridge Wells Council election
 2006 Wakefield Council election
 2006 Waltham Forest Council election
 2006 Wandsworth Council election
 2006 Watford Council election
 2006 Welwyn Hatfield Council election
 2006 West Lancashire Council election
 2006 West Lindsey Council election
 2006 Weymouth and Portland Council election
 2006 Wigan Council election
 2006 Winchester Council election
 2006 Wirral Council election
 2006 Woking Council election
 2006 Wokingham Council election
 2006 Wolverhampton Council election
 2006 Worcester Council election
 2006 Worthing Council election
 2006 Wyre Forest Council election

North America
 2006 Belizean municipal elections
 2006 Costa Rican general election
 2006 Nicaraguan general election
 2006 Panama Canal expansion referendum
 2006 Salvadoran legislative election

Canada
 2006 Canadian electoral calendar
 2006 Canadian federal election
 2006 Canadian federal by-elections
 2006 Green Party of Canada leadership election
 2006 Liberal Party of Canada leadership election
 2006 Progressive Conservative Party of Manitoba leadership election
 2006 Manitoba municipal elections
 2006 New Brunswick general election
 2006 New Democratic Party of Newfoundland and Labrador leadership election
 2006 Nova Scotia general election
 2006 New Democratic Party of Prince Edward Island leadership election
 2006 Progressive Conservative Association of Alberta leadership election
 2006 Progressive Conservative Association of Nova Scotia leadership election
 2006 Quebec municipal elections
 2006 Saskatchewan municipal elections
 2006 Winnipeg municipal election
 2006 Yukon general election

Ontario municipal
 2006 Ontario municipal elections
 2006 Brampton municipal election
 2006 Brantford municipal election
 2006 Cambridge municipal election
 2006 Chatham-Kent municipal election
 2006 Greater Sudbury municipal election
 2006 Guelph municipal election
 2006 Hamilton, Ontario municipal election
 2006 Markham municipal election
 2006 Mississauga municipal election
 2006 Norfolk County municipal election
 2006 Oakville municipal election
 2006 Ottawa municipal election
 2006 Peterborough County municipal elections
 2006 Peterborough municipal election
 2006 Richmond Hill municipal election
 2006 Sault Ste. Marie municipal election
 2006 St. Catharines municipal election
 2006 Thunder Bay municipal election
 2006 Timmins municipal election
 2006 Toronto municipal election
 2006 Vaughan municipal election
 2006 Windsor municipal election

Caribbean
 2006 Costa Rican parliamentary election
 2006 Dominican Republic parliamentary election
 2006 Haitian general election
 2006 Montserratian general election
 2006 Netherlands Antilles general election
 2006 Saint Lucian general election
 2006 Saint Pierre and Miquelon legislative election

Mexico
 2006 Mexican elections
 Alliance for Mexico
 2006 Chiapas state election
 Coalition for the Good of All
 2006 Colima state election
 2006 Mexican Federal District election
 2006 Guanajuato state election
 2006 Jalisco state election
 2006 Mexican general election
 Controversies of the 2006 Mexican general election
 2006 Nuevo León state election
 Socialist Alliance (Mexico)
 2006 Sonora state election
 2006 State of Mexico election
 2006 Tabasco state election

United States
 2006 United States Senate elections
 2006 United States elections
 2006 United States gubernatorial elections
 Fighting Dems
 The Daily Show: Indecision 2006
 2006 Navajo Nation presidential election
 Veterans' Alliance for Security and Democracy
 Video the Vote

United States gubernatorial
 2006 Alabama gubernatorial election
 2006 Alaska gubernatorial election
 2006 Arizona gubernatorial election
 2006 Arkansas gubernatorial election
 2006 California gubernatorial election
 2006 Colorado gubernatorial election
 2006 Connecticut gubernatorial election
 2006 Idaho gubernatorial election
 2006 Illinois gubernatorial election
 2006 Maine gubernatorial election
 2006 Maryland gubernatorial election
 2006 Michigan gubernatorial election
 2006 New Hampshire gubernatorial election
 2006 New Mexico gubernatorial election
 2006 New York gubernatorial election
 2006 Oklahoma gubernatorial election
 2006 Oregon gubernatorial election
 2006 Pennsylvania gubernatorial election
 2006 South Carolina gubernatorial election
 2006 Tennessee gubernatorial election
 2006 Wisconsin gubernatorial election
 2006 Wyoming gubernatorial election

United States mayoral
 2006 New Orleans mayoral election
 2006 Tulsa, Oklahoma mayoral election
 2006 Washington, D.C. mayoral election

Alabama
 2006 Alabama gubernatorial election
 United States House of Representatives elections in Alabama, 2006

Alaska
 2006 Alaska state elections
 2006 Alaska gubernatorial election
 United States House of Representatives election in Alaska, 2006
 Juneau, Alaska, regular election, 2006

American Samoa
 2006 American Samoan legislative election

Arizona
 2006 Arizona gubernatorial election
 2006 Arizona State Legislature election
 2006 Arizona Proposition 107
 2006 Arizona Proposition 207
 2006 Arizona elections
 Proposition 204
 2006 United States Senate election in Arizona
 2006 United States House of Representatives elections in Arizona
 2006 Arizona's 8th congressional district election

Arkansas
 2006 Arkansas state elections
 2006 Arkansas gubernatorial election
 United States House of Representatives elections in Arkansas, 2006

California
 2006 California state elections
 2006 California Attorney General election
 2006 California Insurance Commissioner election
 2006 California Secretary of State election
 2006 California State Controller election
 2006 California State Treasurer election
 2006 California Superintendent of Public Instruction election
 2006 California lieutenant gubernatorial election
 2006 California Courts of Appeal elections
 2006 California gubernatorial election
 2006 Richmond, California municipal elections
 2006 San Francisco Board of Supervisors elections
 June 2006 San Francisco general elections
 November 2006 San Francisco general elections
 2006 California State Senate elections
 2006 California State Assembly elections

California congressional
 2006 California's 50th congressional district special election
 United States Senate election in California, 2006

Colorado
 2006 Colorado gubernatorial election
 United States House of Representatives elections in Colorado, 2006

Connecticut
 Connecticut for Lieberman
 2006 Connecticut Senate election
 2006 Connecticut gubernatorial election
 2006 Connecticut's 4th congressional district election
 United States House of Representatives elections in Connecticut, 2006
 United States Senate election in Connecticut, 2006

Florida
 2006 Florida state elections
 2006 Florida gubernatorial election
 United States House of Representatives elections in Florida, 2006
 United States Senate election in Florida, 2006

Georgia (U.S. state)
 United States House of Representatives elections in Georgia, 2006
 2006 Georgia gubernatorial election
 2006 Georgia statewide elections
 2006 Georgia state elections

Guam
 2006 Guamanian general election

Hawaii
 2006 Hawaii gubernatorial election
 United States House of Representatives elections in Hawaii, 2006
 United States Senate election in Hawaii, 2006

Idaho
 2006 Idaho gubernatorial election
 2006 Idaho legislative elections
 United States House of Representatives elections in Idaho, 2006

Illinois
 2006 Illinois gubernatorial election
 2006 Illinois state elections
 United States House of Representatives elections in Illinois, 2006

Iowa
 2006 Iowa gubernatorial election
 2006 Iowa House of Representatives elections
 2006 Iowa Senate elections

Kansas
 2006 Kansas gubernatorial election
 United States House of Representatives elections in Kansas, 2006

Louisiana
 2006 New Orleans city council election
 2006 New Orleans mayoral election
 2006 United States House of Representatives elections in Louisiana

Maine
 2006 Maine gubernatorial election
 United States House of Representatives elections in Maine, 2006
 United States Senate election in Maine, 2006

Maryland
 2006 Maryland state elections
 2006 Maryland Attorney General election
 2006 Maryland Comptroller election
 2006 Maryland General Assembly elections
 2010 Maryland General Assembly elections
 2006 Maryland county executive elections
 2006 Maryland county offices elections
 2006 Maryland gubernatorial election
 United States House of Representatives elections in Maryland, 2006
 United States Senate election in Maryland, 2006

Massachusetts
 2006 Massachusetts general election
 2006 Massachusetts gubernatorial election
 2006 Massachusetts Governor's Council elections
 2006 Massachusetts House of Representatives elections
 2006 Massachusetts Senate elections
 United States House of Representatives elections in Massachusetts, 2006
 United States Senate election in Massachusetts, 2006

Michigan
 2006 Michigan gubernatorial election
 United States Senate election in Michigan, 2006

Minnesota
 2006 Minnesota gubernatorial election
 2006 Minnesota state auditor election
 2006 Minnesota state elections

Mississippi
 United States House of Representatives elections in Mississippi, 2006

Missouri
 Missouri Constitutional Amendment 2 (2006)
 United States House of Representatives elections in Missouri, 2006

Montana
 United States House of Representatives election in Montana, 2006
 United States Senate election in Montana, 2006

Nebraska
 2006 Nebraska gubernatorial election
 United States House of Representatives elections in Nebraska, 2006

Nevada
 2006 Nevada gubernatorial election

New Hampshire
 2006 New Hampshire gubernatorial election
 2006 New Hampshire state elections
 2006 New Hampshire's 1st congressional district election
 United States House of Representatives elections in New Hampshire, 2006

New Mexico
 2006 New Mexico gubernatorial election
 United States House of Representatives elections in New Mexico, 2006
 United States Senate election in New Mexico, 2006

New York
 2006 New York state elections
 Michael Balboni
 Richard Brodsky
 Andrew Cuomo
 John Faso
 Mark J. Green
 Alan Hevesi
 Christopher Jacobs (politician)
 Charlie King (politician)
 Sean Patrick Maloney
 2006 New York Comptroller election
 2006 New York attorney general election
 2006 New York gubernatorial election
 2006 New York's 13th congressional district election
 2006 New York's 20th congressional district election
 2006 New York's 29th congressional district election
 New York's 99th assembly district
 Denise O'Donnell
 Chauncey Parker
 David Paterson
 Jeanine Pirro
 John Spencer (politician)
 Eliot Spitzer
 United States House of Representatives elections in New York, 2006
 United States Senate election in New York, 2006

North Carolina
 2006 North Carolina judicial elections
 United States House of Representatives elections in North Carolina, 2006

North Dakota
 2006 North Dakota state elections
 United States Senate election in North Dakota, 2006

Ohio
 2006 Ohio gubernatorial election
 2006 Ohio's 2nd congressional district election
 United States House of Representatives elections in Ohio, 2006
 United States Senate election in Ohio, 2006

Oklahoma
 2006 Oklahoma gubernatorial election
 2006 Oklahoma state elections
 2006 Tulsa, Oklahoma mayoral election
 United States House of Representatives elections in Oklahoma, 2006

Oregon
 Oregon Ballot Measure 48 (2006)
 2006 Oregon gubernatorial election
 2006 Oregon primary election
 2006 Oregon's statewide elections
 2006 Portland, Oregon area elections
 United States House of Representatives elections in Oregon, 2006

Pennsylvania
 2006 Pennsylvania gubernatorial election
 2006 Pennsylvania lieutenant gubernatorial election
 2006 Pennsylvania House of Representatives elections
 2006 Pennsylvania Senate elections
 2006 Pennsylvania state elections
 United States House of Representatives elections in Pennsylvania, 2006

Rhode Island
 2006 Rhode Island gubernatorial election
 United States House of Representatives elections in Rhode Island, 2006

South Carolina
 2006 South Carolina state elections
 2006 South Carolina gubernatorial election

South Dakota
 2006 South Dakota gubernatorial election
 United States House of Representatives election in South Dakota, 2006

Tennessee
 2006 Tennessee gubernatorial election
 United States House of Representatives elections in Tennessee, 2006
 United States Senate election in Tennessee, 2006

Texas
 2006 Texas gubernatorial election
 2006 Texas Legislature elections
 2006 Texas general election
 2006 Texas's 22nd congressional district elections
 United States Senate election in Texas, 2006

United States House of Representatives
 2006 United States House of Representatives elections
 United States House of Representatives elections, 2006 – complete list
 United States House of Representatives elections, 2006 – predictions
 United States House of Representatives elections in Alabama, 2006
 United States House of Representatives election in Alaska, 2006
 2006 Arizona's 8th congressional district election
 United States House of Representatives elections in Arkansas, 2006
 United States House of Representatives elections in Colorado, 2006
 United States House of Representatives elections in Connecticut, 2006
 2006 Connecticut's 4th congressional district election
 United States House of Representatives election in Delaware, 2006
 United States House of Representatives elections in Florida, 2006
 2006 Florida's 5th congressional district election
 2006 Florida's 8th congressional district election
 2006 Florida's 9th congressional district election
 2006 Florida's 16th congressional district election
 United States House of Representatives elections in Georgia, 2006
 2006 Georgia's 4th congressional district election
 United States House of Representatives elections in Hawaii, 2006
 United States House of Representatives elections in Idaho, 2006
 United States House of Representatives elections in Illinois, 2006
 2006 Illinois's 6th congressional district election
 2006 Illinois's 8th congressional district election
 2006 Illinois's 10th congressional district election
 2006 Illinois's 11th congressional district election
 2006 Illinois's 19th congressional district election
 United States House of Representatives elections in Indiana, 2006
 2006 Indiana's 7th congressional district election
 United States House of Representatives elections in Iowa, 2006
 United States House of Representatives elections in Kansas, 2006
 United States House of Representatives elections in Kentucky, 2006
 United States House of Representatives elections in Louisiana, 2006
 2006 Louisiana's 2nd congressional district election
 United States House of Representatives elections in Maine, 2006
 United States House of Representatives elections in Maryland, 2006
 United States House of Representatives elections in Massachusetts, 2006
 2006 Minnesota's 5th congressional district election
 2006 Minnesota's 6th congressional district election
 2006 Minnesota's 8th congressional district election
 United States House of Representatives elections in Mississippi, 2006
 United States House of Representatives elections in Missouri, 2006
 United States House of Representatives election in Montana, 2006
 United States House of Representatives elections in Nevada, 2006
 2006 Nevada's 2nd congressional district election
 United States House of Representatives elections in New Hampshire, 2006
 2006 New Hampshire's 1st congressional district election
 United States House of Representatives elections in New Jersey, 2006
 2006 New Jersey's 5th congressional district election
 2006 New Jersey's 13th congressional district election
 United States House of Representatives elections in New Mexico, 2006
 United States House of Representatives elections in New York, 2006
 2006 New York's 13th congressional district election
 2006 New York's 20th congressional district election
 2006 New York's 29th congressional district election
 United States House of Representatives elections in Ohio, 2006
 2006 Ohio's 2nd congressional district election
 United States House of Representatives elections in Oklahoma, 2006
 United States House of Representatives elections in Oregon, 2006
 United States House of Representatives elections in Rhode Island, 2006
 United States House of Representatives elections in South Carolina, 2006
 United States House of Representatives election in South Dakota, 2006
 United States House of Representatives elections in Tennessee, 2006
 2006 Texas's 22nd congressional district elections
 United States House of Representatives elections in Arizona, 2006
 United States House of Representatives elections in Utah, 2006
 United States House of Representatives election in Vermont, 2006
 United States House of Representatives elections in Virginia, 2006
 United States House of Representatives elections in Washington, 2006
 United States House of Representatives elections in West Virginia, 2006
 United States House of Representatives elections in Nebraska, 2006
 2006 West Virginia's 2nd congressional district election
 2006 Wisconsin's 8th congressional district election
 United States House of Representatives elections in Wisconsin, 2006
 United States House of Representatives election in Wyoming, 2006

United States Senate
 2006 United States Senate elections
 United States Senate election in Arizona, 2006
 United States Senate election in California, 2006
 United States Senate election in Connecticut, 2006
 Connecticut for Lieberman
 Controversies of the United States Senate election in Virginia, 2006
 United States Senate election in Delaware, 2006
 United States Senate election in Florida, 2006
 United States Senate election in Hawaii, 2006
 United States Senate election in Indiana, 2006
 United States Senate election in Maine, 2006
 United States Senate election in Maryland, 2006
 United States Senate election in Massachusetts, 2006
 United States Senate election in Michigan, 2006
 United States Senate election in Minnesota, 2006
 United States Senate election in Mississippi, 2006
 2006 United States Senate election in Missouri
 United States Senate election in Montana, 2006
 United States Senate election in Nebraska, 2006
 United States Senate election in Nevada, 2006
 United States Senate election in New Jersey, 2006
 United States Senate election in New Mexico, 2006
 United States Senate election in New York, 2006
 United States Senate election in North Dakota, 2006
 United States Senate election in Ohio, 2006
 United States Senate election in Pennsylvania, 2006
 United States Senate election in Rhode Island, 2006
 United States Senate election in Tennessee, 2006
 United States Senate election in Washington, 2006
 United States Senate election in Wisconsin, 2006
 United States Senate election in Utah, 2006
 United States Senate election in Virginia, 2006
 Macacawitz
 United States Senate election in West Virginia, 2006
 United States Senate election in Wyoming, 2006

Utah
 United States House of Representatives elections in Utah, 2006
 United States Senate election in Utah, 2006

Vermont
 2006 Vermont gubernatorial election
 2006 Vermont Auditor of Accounts election
 2006 Vermont elections

Virginia
 Controversies of the United States Senate election in Virginia, 2006
 United States House of Representatives elections in Virginia, 2006
 United States Senate election in Virginia, 2006

Washington (state)
 2006 Washington State House elections
 2006 Washington State local elections
 2006 Washington State Senate elections
 2006 Washington State Supreme Court elections
 United States House of Representatives elections in Washington, 2006
 Northwest Progressive Institute
 United States Senate election in Washington, 2006
 Washington Initiative 920 (2006)
 Washington Initiative 933 (2006)
 Washington Initiative 937 (2006)
 Washington Resolution 4223 (2006)

Washington, D.C.
 2006 Washington, D.C. mayoral election

West Virginia
 United States House of Representatives elections in West Virginia, 2006
 United States Senate election in West Virginia, 2006
 2006 West Virginia's 2nd congressional district election

Wisconsin
 2006 Wisconsin gubernatorial election
 United States House of Representatives elections in Wisconsin, 2006
 United States Senate election in Wisconsin, 2006
 2006 Wisconsin's 8th congressional district election

Wyoming
 United States House of Representatives election in Wyoming, 2006
 United States Senate election in Wyoming, 2006
 2006 Wyoming gubernatorial election

Oceania
 2006 Akaoa by-election
 2006 American Samoan legislative election
 2006 Cook Islands general election
 2006 Fa’asalele’aga No 2 By-election
 2006 Fijian general election
 2005 Manihiki by-election
 2006 Samoan general election
 2006 Solomon Islands general election
 2006 Teenui-Mapumai by-election
 2006 Tokelauan self-determination referendum
 2006 Tuvaluan general election

American Samoa
 2006 American Samoan legislative election

Australia
 2006 Australian Labor Party leadership election
 2006 Gaven state by-election
 2006 Queensland state election
 2006 Results and maps of the Victorian state election
 2006 South Australian state election
 2006 Tasmanian state election
 2006 Victoria Park state by-election
 2006 Victorian state election

Guam
 2006 Guamanian general election

Hawaii
 2006 Hawaii gubernatorial election
 United States House of Representatives elections in Hawaii, 2006
 United States Senate election in Hawaii, 2006

Singapore general
 2006 Singaporean general election
 2006 Pre-election-day events of the Singaporean general election

South America
 2006 Brazilian general election
 2005–2006 Chilean presidential election
 2006 Colombian presidential election
 2006 Colombian legislative election
 2006 Ecuadorian general election
 2006 Guyanese legislative election
 2006 Peruvian general election
 2006 Rio Grande do Sul State Elections
 2006 São Paulo state election
 2006 Venezuelan presidential election

United States
 2006 United States Senate elections
 2006 United States elections
 2006 United States gubernatorial elections
 Fighting Dems
 The Daily Show: Indecision 2006
 2006 Navajo Nation presidential election
 Veterans' Alliance for Security and Democracy
 Video the Vote

United States gubernatorial
 2006 Alabama gubernatorial election
 2006 Alaska gubernatorial election
 2006 Arizona gubernatorial election
 2006 Arkansas gubernatorial election
 2006 California gubernatorial election
 2006 Colorado gubernatorial election
 2006 Connecticut gubernatorial election
 2006 Idaho gubernatorial election
 2006 Illinois gubernatorial election
 2006 Maine gubernatorial election
 2006 Maryland gubernatorial election
 2006 Michigan gubernatorial election
 2006 New Hampshire gubernatorial election
 2006 New Mexico gubernatorial election
 2006 New York gubernatorial election
 2006 Oklahoma gubernatorial election
 2006 Oregon gubernatorial election
 2006 Pennsylvania gubernatorial election
 2006 South Carolina gubernatorial election
 2006 Tennessee gubernatorial election
 2006 Wisconsin gubernatorial election
 2006 Wyoming gubernatorial election

United States mayoral
 2006 New Orleans mayoral election
 2006 Tulsa, Oklahoma mayoral election
 2006 Washington, D.C. mayoral election

Alabama
 2006 Alabama gubernatorial election
 United States House of Representatives elections in Alabama, 2006

Alaska
 2006 Alaska state elections
 2006 Alaska gubernatorial election
 United States House of Representatives election in Alaska, 2006
 Juneau, Alaska, regular election, 2006

American Samoa
 2006 American Samoan legislative election

Arizona
 2006 Arizona gubernatorial election
 2006 Arizona Legislature elections
 Arizona Proposition 107 (2006)
 Arizona Proposition 207 (2006)
 2006 Arizona state elections
 Proposition 204
 United States Senate election in Arizona, 2006
 United States House of Representatives elections in Arizona, 2006
 2006 Arizona's 8th congressional district election

Arkansas
 2006 Arkansas state elections
 2006 Arkansas gubernatorial election
 United States House of Representatives elections in Arkansas, 2006

California
 2006 California state elections
 2006 California Attorney General election
 2006 California Insurance Commissioner election
 2006 California Secretary of State election
 2006 California State Controller election
 2006 California State Treasurer election
 2006 California Superintendent of Public Instruction election
 2006 California lieutenant gubernatorial election
 2006 California Courts of Appeal elections
 2006 California gubernatorial election
 2006 Richmond, California municipal elections
 2006 San Francisco Board of Supervisors elections
 June 2006 San Francisco general elections
 November 2006 San Francisco general elections
 2006 California State Senate elections
 2006 California State Assembly elections

California congressional
 2006 California's 50th congressional district special election
 United States Senate election in California, 2006

Colorado
 2006 Colorado gubernatorial election
 United States House of Representatives elections in Colorado, 2006

Connecticut
 Connecticut for Lieberman
 2006 Connecticut Senate election
 2006 Connecticut gubernatorial election
 2006 Connecticut's 4th congressional district election
 United States House of Representatives elections in Connecticut, 2006
 United States Senate election in Connecticut, 2006

Florida
 2006 Florida state elections
 2006 Florida gubernatorial election
 United States House of Representatives elections in Florida, 2006
 United States Senate election in Florida, 2006

Georgia (U.S. state)
 United States House of Representatives elections in Georgia, 2006
 2006 Georgia gubernatorial election
 2006 Georgia statewide elections
 2006 Georgia state elections

Guam
 2006 Guamanian general election

Hawaii
 2006 Hawaii gubernatorial election
 United States House of Representatives elections in Hawaii, 2006
 United States Senate election in Hawaii, 2006

Idaho
 2006 Idaho gubernatorial election
 2006 Idaho legislative elections
 United States House of Representatives elections in Idaho, 2006

Illinois
 2006 Illinois gubernatorial election
 2006 Illinois state elections
 United States House of Representatives elections in Illinois, 2006

Iowa
 2006 Iowa gubernatorial election
 2006 Iowa House of Representatives elections
 2006 Iowa Senate elections

Kansas
 2006 Kansas gubernatorial election
 United States House of Representatives elections in Kansas, 2006

Louisiana
 2006 Louisiana's 2nd congressional district election
 2006 New Orleans city council election
 2006 New Orleans mayoral election
 United States House of Representatives elections in Louisiana, 2006

Maine
 2006 Maine gubernatorial election
 United States House of Representatives elections in Maine, 2006
 United States Senate election in Maine, 2006

Maryland
 2006 Maryland state elections
 2006 Maryland Attorney General election
 2006 Maryland Comptroller election
 2006 Maryland General Assembly elections
 2010 Maryland General Assembly elections
 2006 Maryland county executive elections
 2006 Maryland county offices elections
 2006 Maryland gubernatorial election
 United States House of Representatives elections in Maryland, 2006
 United States Senate election in Maryland, 2006

Massachusetts
 2006 Massachusetts general election
 2006 Massachusetts gubernatorial election
 2006 Massachusetts Governor's Council elections
 2006 Massachusetts House of Representatives elections
 2006 Massachusetts Senate elections
 United States House of Representatives elections in Massachusetts, 2006
 United States Senate election in Massachusetts, 2006

Michigan
 2006 Michigan gubernatorial election
 United States Senate election in Michigan, 2006

Minnesota
 2006 Minnesota gubernatorial election
 2006 Minnesota state auditor election
 2006 Minnesota state elections

Mississippi
 United States House of Representatives elections in Mississippi, 2006

Missouri
 Missouri Constitutional Amendment 2 (2006)
 United States House of Representatives elections in Missouri, 2006

Montana
 United States House of Representatives election in Montana, 2006
 United States Senate election in Montana, 2006

Nebraska
 2006 Nebraska gubernatorial election
 United States House of Representatives elections in Nebraska, 2006

Nevada
 2006 Nevada gubernatorial election

New Hampshire
 2006 New Hampshire gubernatorial election
 2006 New Hampshire state elections
 2006 New Hampshire's 1st congressional district election
 United States House of Representatives elections in New Hampshire, 2006

New Mexico
 2006 New Mexico gubernatorial election
 United States House of Representatives elections in New Mexico, 2006
 United States Senate election in New Mexico, 2006

New York
 2006 New York state elections
 Michael Balboni
 Richard Brodsky
 Andrew Cuomo
 John Faso
 Mark J. Green
 Alan Hevesi
 Christopher Jacobs (politician)
 Charlie King (politician)
 Sean Patrick Maloney
 2006 New York Comptroller election
 2006 New York attorney general election
 2006 New York gubernatorial election
 2006 New York's 13th congressional district election
 2006 New York's 20th congressional district election
 2006 New York's 29th congressional district election
 New York's 99th assembly district
 Denise O'Donnell
 Chauncey Parker
 David Paterson
 Jeanine Pirro
 John Spencer (politician)
 Eliot Spitzer
 United States House of Representatives elections in New York, 2006
 United States Senate election in New York, 2006

North Carolina
 2006 North Carolina judicial elections
 United States House of Representatives elections in North Carolina, 2006

North Dakota
 2006 North Dakota state elections
 United States Senate election in North Dakota, 2006

Ohio
 2006 Ohio gubernatorial election
 2006 Ohio's 2nd congressional district election
 United States House of Representatives elections in Ohio, 2006
 United States Senate election in Ohio, 2006

Oklahoma
 2006 Oklahoma gubernatorial election
 2006 Oklahoma state elections
 2006 Tulsa, Oklahoma mayoral election
 United States House of Representatives elections in Oklahoma, 2006

Oregon
 Oregon Ballot Measure 48 (2006)
 2006 Oregon gubernatorial election
 2006 Oregon primary election
 2006 Oregon's statewide elections
 2006 Portland, Oregon area elections
 United States House of Representatives elections in Oregon, 2006

Pennsylvania
 2006 Pennsylvania gubernatorial election
 2006 Pennsylvania lieutenant gubernatorial election
 2006 Pennsylvania House of Representatives elections
 2006 Pennsylvania Senate elections
 2006 Pennsylvania state elections
 United States House of Representatives elections in Pennsylvania, 2006

Rhode Island
 2006 Rhode Island gubernatorial election
 United States House of Representatives elections in Rhode Island, 2006

South Carolina
 2006 South Carolina state elections
 2006 South Carolina gubernatorial election

South Dakota
 2006 South Dakota gubernatorial election
 United States House of Representatives election in South Dakota, 2006

Tennessee
 2006 Tennessee gubernatorial election
 United States House of Representatives elections in Tennessee, 2006
 United States Senate election in Tennessee, 2006

Texas
 2006 Texas gubernatorial election
 2006 Texas Legislature elections
 2006 Texas general election
 2006 Texas's 22nd congressional district elections
 United States Senate election in Texas, 2006

United States House of Representatives
 2006 United States House of Representatives elections
 United States House of Representatives elections, 2006 – complete list
 United States House of Representatives elections, 2006 – predictions
 United States House of Representatives elections in Alabama, 2006
 United States House of Representatives election in Alaska, 2006
 2006 Arizona's 8th congressional district election
 United States House of Representatives elections in Arkansas, 2006
 United States House of Representatives elections in Colorado, 2006
 United States House of Representatives elections in Connecticut, 2006
 2006 Connecticut's 4th congressional district election
 United States House of Representatives election in Delaware, 2006
 United States House of Representatives elections in Florida, 2006
 2006 Florida's 5th congressional district election
 2006 Florida's 8th congressional district election
 2006 Florida's 9th congressional district election
 2006 Florida's 16th congressional district election
 United States House of Representatives elections in Georgia, 2006
 2006 Georgia's 4th congressional district election
 United States House of Representatives elections in Hawaii, 2006
 United States House of Representatives elections in Idaho, 2006
 United States House of Representatives elections in Illinois, 2006
 2006 Illinois's 6th congressional district election
 2006 Illinois's 8th congressional district election
 2006 Illinois's 10th congressional district election
 2006 Illinois's 11th congressional district election
 2006 Illinois's 19th congressional district election
 United States House of Representatives elections in Indiana, 2006
 2006 Indiana's 7th congressional district election
 United States House of Representatives elections in Iowa, 2006
 United States House of Representatives elections in Kansas, 2006
 United States House of Representatives elections in Kentucky, 2006
 United States House of Representatives elections in Louisiana, 2006
 2006 Louisiana's 2nd congressional district election
 United States House of Representatives elections in Maine, 2006
 United States House of Representatives elections in Maryland, 2006
 United States House of Representatives elections in Massachusetts, 2006
 2006 Minnesota's 5th congressional district election
 2006 Minnesota's 6th congressional district election
 2006 Minnesota's 8th congressional district election
 United States House of Representatives elections in Mississippi, 2006
 United States House of Representatives elections in Missouri, 2006
 United States House of Representatives election in Montana, 2006
 United States House of Representatives elections in Nevada, 2006
 2006 Nevada's 2nd congressional district election
 United States House of Representatives elections in New Hampshire, 2006
 2006 New Hampshire's 1st congressional district election
 United States House of Representatives elections in New Jersey, 2006
 2006 New Jersey's 5th congressional district election
 2006 New Jersey's 13th congressional district election
 United States House of Representatives elections in New Mexico, 2006
 United States House of Representatives elections in New York, 2006
 2006 New York's 13th congressional district election
 2006 New York's 20th congressional district election
 2006 New York's 29th congressional district election
 United States House of Representatives elections in Ohio, 2006
 2006 Ohio's 2nd congressional district election
 United States House of Representatives elections in Oklahoma, 2006
 United States House of Representatives elections in Oregon, 2006
 United States House of Representatives elections in Rhode Island, 2006
 United States House of Representatives elections in South Carolina, 2006
 United States House of Representatives election in South Dakota, 2006
 United States House of Representatives elections in Tennessee, 2006
 2006 Texas's 22nd congressional district elections
 United States House of Representatives elections in Arizona, 2006
 United States House of Representatives elections in Utah, 2006
 United States House of Representatives election in Vermont, 2006
 United States House of Representatives elections in Virginia, 2006
 United States House of Representatives elections in Washington, 2006
 United States House of Representatives elections in West Virginia, 2006
 United States House of Representatives elections in Nebraska, 2006
 2006 West Virginia's 2nd congressional district election
 2006 Wisconsin's 8th congressional district election
 United States House of Representatives elections in Wisconsin, 2006
 United States House of Representatives election in Wyoming, 2006

United States Senate
 2006 United States Senate elections
 United States Senate election in Arizona, 2006
 United States Senate election in California, 2006
 United States Senate election in Connecticut, 2006
 Connecticut for Lieberman
 Controversies of the United States Senate election in Virginia, 2006
 United States Senate election in Delaware, 2006
 United States Senate election in Florida, 2006
 United States Senate election in Hawaii, 2006
 United States Senate election in Indiana, 2006
 United States Senate election in Maine, 2006
 United States Senate election in Maryland, 2006
 United States Senate election in Massachusetts, 2006
 United States Senate election in Michigan, 2006
 United States Senate election in Minnesota, 2006
 United States Senate election in Mississippi, 2006
 2006 United States Senate election in Missouri
 United States Senate election in Montana, 2006
 United States Senate election in Nebraska, 2006
 United States Senate election in Nevada, 2006
 United States Senate election in New Jersey, 2006
 United States Senate election in New Mexico, 2006
 United States Senate election in New York, 2006
 United States Senate election in North Dakota, 2006
 United States Senate election in Ohio, 2006
 United States Senate election in Pennsylvania, 2006
 United States Senate election in Rhode Island, 2006
 United States Senate election in Tennessee, 2006
 United States Senate election in Washington, 2006
 United States Senate election in Wisconsin, 2006
 United States Senate election in Utah, 2006
 United States Senate election in Virginia, 2006
 Macacawitz
 United States Senate election in West Virginia, 2006
 United States Senate election in Wyoming, 2006

Utah
 United States House of Representatives elections in Utah, 2006
 United States Senate election in Utah, 2006

Vermont
 2006 Vermont gubernatorial election
 2006 Vermont Auditor of Accounts election
 2006 Vermont elections

Virginia
 Controversies of the United States Senate election in Virginia, 2006
 United States House of Representatives elections in Virginia, 2006
 United States Senate election in Virginia, 2006

Washington (U.S. state)
 2006 Washington State House elections
 2006 Washington State local elections
 2006 Washington State Senate elections
 2006 Washington State Supreme Court elections
 United States House of Representatives elections in Washington, 2006
 Northwest Progressive Institute
 United States Senate election in Washington, 2006
 Washington Initiative 920 (2006)
 Washington Initiative 933 (2006)
 Washington Initiative 937 (2006)
 Washington Resolution 4223 (2006)

Washington, D.C.
 2006 Washington, D.C. mayoral election

West Virginia
 United States House of Representatives elections in West Virginia, 2006
 United States Senate election in West Virginia, 2006
 2006 West Virginia's 2nd congressional district election

Wisconsin
 2006 Wisconsin gubernatorial election
 United States House of Representatives elections in Wisconsin, 2006
 United States Senate election in Wisconsin, 2006
 2006 Wisconsin's 8th congressional district election

Wyoming
 United States House of Representatives election in Wyoming, 2006
 United States Senate election in Wyoming, 2006
 2006 Wyoming gubernatorial election

See also

 
2006
Elections